Camiare Airport  is an airstrip in the pampa of the Beni Department in Bolivia. The nearest town is Santa Ana del Yacuma,  to the northeast.

See also

Transport in Bolivia
List of airports in Bolivia

References

External links 
OpenStreetMap - Camiare
Bing Maps - Camiare

Airports in Beni Department